This is a list of Brussels tram routes : 

 tram route 3: from Churchill to Esplanade
 tram route 4: from Stalle car park to the Brussels-North railway station
tram route 7: from Vanderkindere to the Heysel metro station
 tram route 8: from Roodebeek metro station to Louise metro station
 tram route 9: from Arbre Ballon to Simonis metro station
 tram route 19: from Groot-Bijgaarden to De Wand
 tram route 25: from the Boondael railway station to the Rogier metro station
 tram route 32: from the Drogenbos castle to Da Vinci (runs only after 8.00 pm)
 tram route 39: from the Montgomery metro station to Ban Eik
 tram route 44: from the Montgomery metro station to the former Tervuren railway station (until the 1960s, this route was a railway line starting from Etterbeek railway station)
 tram route 51: from Van Haelen to the Stade Stadium
 tram route 55: from the Rogier metro station to Da Vinci
 tram route 62: from Eurocontrol to the Jette cemetery
 tram route 81: from Marius Renard to the Montgomery metro station
 tram route 82: from the Berchem-Sainte-Agathe railway station to the Drogenbos castle (to Brussels-South railway station after 8pm)
 tram route 92: from Fort Jaco to the Schaerbeek railway station
 tram route 93: from Legrand to the Stade Stadium
 tram route 97: from Dieweg to the Louise metro station

References

External links
 STIB/MIVB

Tram
Tram, Brussels
Brussels